Sensorvault is an internal Google database that contains records of users' historical geo-location data. 

It has been used by law enforcement to obtain a geo-fence warrant and to search for all devices within the vicinity of a crime, (within a geo-fenced area)   and after looking at those devices' movements and narrowing those devices down to potential suspects or witnesses, then asking Google for the information about the owners of those devices.

References

Internet privacy
Google
Geographical databases